This page details J. League records.

J1 League

Ranks
.
In bold the ones who are actually playing in J1. In italic the ones who are still active in other Japanese league.

Individual
Most career goals : 191 goals
 Yoshito Okubo
Most career hat-tricks : 8 times
 Ueslei
Most career appearances : 672 appearances
 Yasuhito Endo
Most goals in a season : 36 goals
 Masashi Nakayama (1998)
Most hat-tricks in a season : 5 times
 Masashi Nakayama (1998)
Most goals in a game : 5 goals
 Koji Noguchi for Bellmare Hiratsuka vs Kashima Antlers (3 May 1995)
 Edílson for Kashiwa Reysol vs Gamba Osaka (4 May 1996)
 Masashi Nakayama for Jubilo Iwata vs Cerezo Osaka (15 April 1998)
 Wagner Lopes for Nagoya Grampus Eight vs Urawa Red Diamonds (29 May 1999)
Youngest player : 15 years 10 months and 6 days
 Takayuki Morimoto for Tokyo Verdy 1969 vs Jubilo Iwata (13 March 2004)
Youngest goalscorer : 15 years 11 months and 28 days
 Takayuki Morimoto for Tokyo Verdy 1969 vs JEF United Ichihara (5 May 2004)
Oldest player : 54 years 12 days
 Kazuyoshi Miura for Yokohama FC vs Urawa Red Diamonds (12 March 2021)
Oldest goalscorer : 41 years 3 months and 12 days
 Zico for Kashima Antlers vs Jubilo Iwata (15 June 1994)
Fastest goal : 8 seconds
 Hisato Sato for Sanfrecce Hiroshima vs Cerezo Osaka (22 April 2006)
Fastest hat-trick : 3 minutes
 Yasuo Manaka for Cerezo Osaka vs Kashiwa Reysol (14 July 2001)
First scorer
 Henny Meijer for Verdy Kawasaki vs Yokohama Marinos (15 May 1993)
First hat-trick
 Zico for Kashima Antlers vs Nagoya Grampus Eight (16 May 1993)

Club
Most League championships : 8 times
Kashima Antlers (1996, 1998, 2000, 2001, 2007, 2008, 2009, 2016)
Longest uninterrupted spell in J1: 30 seasons (1993-Present)
Kashima Antlers
Yokohama F. Marinos
Most goals scored in a season : 107 goals
Jubilo Iwata (1998)
Fewest goals scored in a season : 16 goals
Tokushima Vortis (2014)
Most goals conceded in a season : 111 goals
Yokohama Flügels (1995)
Fewest goals conceded in a season : 24 goals
Oita Trinita (2008)
Biggest goal difference in a season : 68 goals
Jubilo Iwata (1998)
Most points in a season : 108 points
Verdy Kawasaki (1995)
Fewest points in a season : 13 points
Bellmare Hiratsuka (1999)
Most wins in a season : 35 wins
Verdy Kawasaki (1995)
Fewest wins in a season : 2 wins
Oita Trinita (2013)
Most draws in a season : 16 draws
Shonan Bellmare (2021)
Most losses in a season : 34 losses
Gamba Osaka (1995)
Fewest losses in a season : 2 losses
Kawasaki Frontale (2021)
Most goals in a game  : 12 goals
Cerezo Osaka 5-7 Kashiwa Reysol (8 August 1998)
Record win : 9–1, 8-0
Jubilo Iwata 9-1 Cerezo Osaka (15 April 1998)
Vissel Kobe 0-8 Oita Trinita (26 July 2003)
Shimizu S-Pulse 0-8 Hokkaido Consadole Sapporo (17 August 2019)
Yokohama F. Marinos 8-0 FC Tokyo (6 November 2021)
Highest scoring draw: 5-5
Vissel Kobe 5-5 JEF United Ichihara (14 October 1998)
Highest average home attendance in a season : 47,609
Urawa Red Diamonds (2008)
Highest home attendance : 63,854 (regular season)
Yokohama F. Marinos 3–0 FC Tokyo (7 December 2019)
64,899 (Suntory Championship)
Yokohama F. Marinos 1–0 Urawa Reds (5 December 2004)

J2 League
As of October 23rd, 2022.

Ranks
Updated to March 18th, 2023.

In bold the ones who are actually playing in J2. In italic the ones who are still active in other league.

Individual
Most career goals : 108 goals
 Masashi Oguro
Most career hat-tricks : 6 times
 Juninho
Most career appearances : 575 appearances
 Koji Homma
Most goals in a season : 37 goals
 Juninho (2004)
 Hulk (2007)
Most hat-tricks in a season : 3 times
 Marcus (2003)
 Juninho (2003)
 Juninho (2004)
 Hulk (2007)
Most J2 titless : 4 titles
 Seiya Fujita (2007, 2014, 2017, 2020)
Most goals in a game : 8 goals
 Michael Olunga for Kashiwa Reysol vs Kyoto Sanga (24 November 2019)
Youngest player : 16 years 2 months and 25 days
 Rikuto Hashimoto for Tokyo Verdy vs Avispa Fukuoka (28 February 2021)
Youngest goalscorer : 16 years 11 months 17 days
 Kota Kawano  for Renofa Yamaguchi vs V-Varen Nagasaki (29 July 2020)
Oldest player : 52 years, 8 months and 29 days
 Kazuyoshi Miura for Yokohama FC vs Ehime FC (24 November 2019)
Oldest goalscorer : 50 years and 15 days
 Kazuyoshi Miura for Yokohama FC vs Thespakusatsu Gunma (12 March 2017)
First scorer
 Hayato Okamoto for FC Tokyo vs Sagan Tosu (14 March 1999)
First hat-trick
 Koichiro Katafuchi for Sagan Tosu vs Consadole Sapporo (28 March 1999)

Club
Most League championships : 3 times
Consadole Sapporo (2000, 2007, 2016)
Most years in J2/Longest uninterrupted spell in J2: 24 seasons (2000-present)
Mito HollyHock
Most goals scored in a season : 104 goals
Kawasaki Frontale (2004)
Fewest goals scored in a season : 20 goals
Giravanz Kitakyushu (2010)
Most goals conceded in a season : 98 goals
Ventforet Kofu (2001)
Fewest goals conceded in a season : 22 goals
Consadole Sapporo (2000)
FC Tokyo (2011)
Biggest goal difference in a season : 66 goals
Kawasaki Frontale (2004)
Most points in a season : 106 points
Vegalta Sendai (2009)
Fewest points in a season : 15 points
Giravanz Kitakyushu (2010)
Most wins in a season : 34 wins
Kawasaki Frontale (2004)
Fewest wins in a season : 1 win
Giravanz Kitakyushu (2010)
Most draws in a season : 23 draws
Tokushima Vortis (2022)
Most losses in a season : 34 losses
Ventforet Kofu (2001)
Fewest losses in a season : 2 losses
Kashiwa Reysol (2010)
Most goals in a game  : 14 goals
Kashiwa Reysol 13-1 Kyoto Sanga (24 November 2019)
Record win :
Kashiwa Reysol 13-1 Kyoto Sanga (24 November 2019)
Highest scoring draw: 4-4
Tokushima Vortis 4-4 Giravanz Kitakyushu (22 August 2010)
Sagan Tosu 4-4 Yokohama FC (17 October 2010)
FC Gifu 4-4 Sagan Tosu (30 October 2011)
JEF United Chiba 4-4 Cerezo Osaka (1 April 2015)
FC Gifu 4-4 V-Varen Nagasaki (21 May 2017)
Omiya Ardija 4-4 Renofa Yamaguchi (26 August 2018)
SC Sagamihara 4-4 Mito HollyHock (3 October 2021)
Highest average attendance in a season : 30,339
Albirex Niigata (2003)
Highest attendance : 42,223
Albirex Niigata 1-0 Omiya Ardija (23 November 2003)

J3 League
Updated to November 26th, 2022.

Ranks
.
In bold the ones who are actually playing in J3. In italic the ones who are still active in another league.

Individual
Most career goals : 73 goals
 Tsugutoshi Oishi
Most career hat-tricks : 3 times
 Tsugutoshi Oishi
Most career appearances : 251 appearances
 Akio Yoshida
Most goals in a season : 32 goals
 Kazuhito Kishida (2015)
Most hat-tricks in a season : 2 times
 Kazuhito Kishida,  Takaki Fukimitsu (2015)
 Noriaki Fujimoto (2017)
 Tsugutoshi Oishi (2020)
Most goals in a game : 4 goals
 Tsugutoshi Oishi for Fujieda MYFC vs Nagano Parceiro (30 March 2014)
 Koji Suzuki for Machida Zelvia vs J. League U-22 Selection (26 April 2014)
 Hiroki Higuchi for SC Sagamihara vs Fujieda MYFC (28 June 2015)
 Yuta Togashi for FC Ryukyu vs SC Sagamihara (10 June 2018)
 Naoki Sanda for Vanraure Hachinohe vs Kamatamare Sanuki (14 July 2019)
Youngest player : 15 years 5 months and 1 day
 Takefusa Kubo for FC Tokyo U-23 vs Nagano Parceiro (5 November 2016)
Youngest goalscorer : 15 years 10 months and 11 days
 Takefusa Kubo for FC Tokyo U-23 vs Cerezo Osaka (15 April 2017)
Oldest player: 48 years 1 month 28 days
 Teruyoshi Ito for Azul Claro Numazu vs SC Sagamihara (30 October 2022)
Oldest goalscorer : 41 years 11 months and 11 days
 Hideo Hashimoto for FC Imabari vs Tegevajaro Miyazaki (2 May 2021)
Fastest hat-trick : 10 minutes
 Naoki Sanda for Vanraure Hachinohe vs Kamatamare Sanuki (14 July 2019)
First scorer
 Keisuke Endo for Machida Zelvia vs Fujieda MYFC (9 March 2014)
First hat-trick
 Masao Tsuji for Zweigen Kanazawa vs YSCC Yokohama (29 March 2014)

Club
Most League championships : 2 times
Blaublitz Akita (2017, 2020)
Longest uninterrupted spell in J3: 10 seasons (2014-present)
Fukushima United FC
Gainare Tottori
Nagano Parceiro
YSCC Yokohama
Most goals scored in a season : 96 goals
Renofa Yamaguchi (2015)
Fewest goals scored in a season : 15 goals
YSCC Yokohama (2016)
Most goals conceded in a season : 71 goals
J.League U-22 Selection (2015)
Fewest goals conceded in a season : 18 goals
Machida Zelvia (2015)
Blaublitz Akita (2020)
Biggest goal difference in a season : 60 goals
Renofa Yamaguchi (2015)
Most points in a season : 78 points
Renofa Yamaguchi, Machida Zelvia (2015)
Fewest points in a season : 20 points
YSCC Yokohama (2016)
Most wins in a season : 25 wins
Renofa Yamaguchi (2015)
Fewest wins in a season : 4 wins
YSCC Yokohama (2014)
Gainare Tottori (2017)
Kamatamare Sanuki (2021)
Most draws in a season : 13 draws
Fukushima United FC (2018)
Most losses in a season : 23 losses
YSCC Yokohama (2015)
Fewest losses in a season : 3 losses
Blaublitz Akita (2020)
Most goals in a game  : 10 goals
FC Ryukyu 4-6 SC Sagamihara (8 November 2015)
YSCC Yokohama 5-5 Gamba Osaka U-23 (16 August 2020)
Kagoshima United FC 6-4 Gamba Osaka U-23 (13 December 2020)
Record win :
Renofa Yamaguchi 8-0 J.League U-22 Selection (21 March 2015)
Highest scoring draw:
YSCC Yokohama 5-5 Gamba Osaka U-23 (16 August 2020)
Highest average home attendance in a season : 8,401
Matsumoto Yamaga (2022)
Highest home attendance : 16,027
Roasso Kumamoto 1-0 Gamba Osaka U-23 (7 September 2019)

J. League Cup

Ranks
.
In bold the ones who are actually playing in the J. League Cup. In italic the ones who are still active.

Individual
Most career goals : 29 goals
 Hisato Sato
Most career appearances : 109 appearances
 Nobuhisa Yamada
Most goals in a season : 9 goals
 Washington (2006)
Most goals in a game : 4 goals
 Shun Nagasawa for Gamba Osaka vs Nagoya Grampus (4 April 2018)
 Washington for Urawa Red Diamonds vs Kawasaki Frontale (3 June 2006)
 Wagner Lopes for Shonan Bellmare vs Vegalta Sendai (19 March 1997)
 Edílson for Kashiwa Reysol vs Vissel Kobe (8 March 1997)
 Bismarck for Tokyo Verdy vs Gamba Osaka (3 August 1994)
Youngest player : 15 years 10 months and 20 days
 Takayuki Morimoto for Tokyo Verdy vs Cerezo Osaka (27 March 2004)
Youngest goalscorer : 16 years 9 months and 18 days
 Takefusa Kubo for FC Tokyo vs Albirex Niigata (14 March 2018)
Oldest player : 54 years 2 months and 23 days
 Kazuyoshi Miura for Yokohama FC vs Urawa Red Diamonds (19 May 2021)
Oldest goalscorer : 42 years 9 months and 9 days
 Yukio Tsuchiya for Ventforet Kofu vs Vissel Kobe (10 May 2017)
First scorer
 Kazuyoshi Miura for Tokyo Verdy vs Kashima Antlers (16 October 1992)

Club
Most League championships : 6 times
Kashima Antlers (1997, 2000, 2002, 2011, 2012, 2015)
Most goals in a game  : 10 goals
Shimizu S-Pulse 4.6 Nagoya Grampus (30 August 2000)
Record win :
Cerezo Osaka 8-1 Avispa Fukuoka (3 July 1996)
Kashima Antlers 7-0 Consadole Sapporo (18 October 1997)
Highest home attendance : 56,064
Kashima Antlers 1-0 Urawa Red Diamonds (4 November 2002)

All-time J1 League standings

References